Vellavely  or Vellaveli or Vellaaveli (Vellāveḷi,  Velivella) is a town in the Batticaloa District of Sri Lanka, it is located about 30 km South of Batticaloa.

See also

 Kokkadichcholai

References

Towns in Batticaloa District
Porativupattu DS Division